MTV OMG was a British pay television music channel operated by Paramount Networks UK & Australia. It launched on 1 March 2018, replacing free-to-air sister music channel Viva. The audience profile on Sky Media showed that the channel had a 60/40 viewer bias in favor of women. The channel aired its own weekly OMG Top 20 charts, which were chosen by the channel.

History

The network launched on 1 March 2018, one month after Viva's discontinuation, with a love song-focused video playlist branded as MTV Love airing throughout February. From 2018 until 2020, MTV OMG was temporarily renamed MTV Pride to coincide with Pride in London, which celebrates the LGBT+ community. Before 2018, this temporary renaming was carried out on its sister channel MTV Classic.

Programming 

 OMG's Weekend Hits!
 2-4-1 Happy Hour Hits!
 OMG's Pop Obsessions!
 OMG! 00s Hits!
 OMG Loves: (artist)
 (artist) vs (artist): Pop Battle!
 Tree Mendous Tinsel Tunes!
 OMG! It's Goodbye!
 Hottest 20 Girls in the World!
 Summer is Fri-Nally Here! Hot 50 Summer Tunes!
 All New! This Week's OMG Top 20
 Top 50 OMG Music Moments

Closure
This channel, along with its sister channels Club MTV and MTV Rocks, was closed permanently on 20 July 2020, folding the channel space that had been established by TMF in October 2002. The last music video played on the channel was "Thank You for the Music" by ABBA.

References

External links
 MTV OMG - presentation, screenshots
 Prezentacja MTV Love UK & Ireland | Zapper (itizaps.net)
 MTV 00s - presentation, screenshots

MTV channels
Music video networks in the United Kingdom
Television channels and stations established in 2018
Television channels and stations disestablished in 2020
2018 establishments in the United Kingdom
2020 disestablishments in the United Kingdom
Defunct television channels in the United Kingdom